Jeremy Harris (born April 26, 1991) is a Canadian football cornerback for the Winnipeg Blue Bombers of the Canadian Football League (CFL). He was drafted by the Jacksonville Jaguars in the seventh round (208th overall) of the 2013 NFL Draft. He played college football for New Mexico State, where he was coached by Jacksonville Jaguars defensive backs coach DeWayne Walker and defensive assistant Mike Rutenberg. Prior to playing for New Mexico State, Harris played for East Los Angeles Community College.

Professional career

Jacksonville Jaguars
Harris was placed on injured reserve on August 25, 2013, ending his rookie season. In the 2014 season, Harris made his NFL debut against the Philadelphia Eagles on September 7, 2014. He was released on September 4, 2015.

Kansas City Chiefs
Harris was signed on September 8, 2015, to the practice squad by the Kansas City Chiefs. On October 13, 2015, was released by the Chiefs.

New York Jets
Harris was signed by the New York Jets to their practice squad on October 20, 2015. On November 13, he was released from practice squad.

Washington Redskins
On November 30, 2015, Harris was signed to the Washington Redskins' practice squad. On December 29, 2015, he was promoted to the active roster. On August 27, 2016, Harris was waived by the Redskins.

BC Lions 
On September 19, 2016, Harris signed onto the practice squad of the BC Lions of the Canadian Football League. He was released by the Lions on November 1, 2016.

Winnipeg Blue Bombers 
On January 24, 2017, Harris signed with the Winnipeg Blue Bombers.

References

External links
Jacksonville Jaguars bio
New Mexico State Aggies bio

1991 births
Living people
Players of American football from Los Angeles
American football cornerbacks
Canadian football defensive backs
American players of Canadian football
East Los Angeles Huskies football players
New Mexico State Aggies football players
Jacksonville Jaguars players
Kansas City Chiefs players
Washington Redskins players
BC Lions players
Winnipeg Blue Bombers players
Susan Miller Dorsey High School alumni
Players of Canadian football from Los Angeles